Urbahn is a surname. Notable people with the surname include:

Keith Urbahn, American speechwriter and PR executive
Max O. Urbahn (died 1995), American architect
Roger Urbahn (1934–1984), New Zealand rugby union player, cricketer, and sports journalist

See also
Urban (name)